Rorer or Rörer may refer to:

People
 Georg Rörer (1492–1557), Lutheran reformer and pastor
 Posey Rorer (1891–1936), American fiddler
 Sarah Tyson Rorer (1849–1937), American pioneer in the field of domestic science
 Rorer A. James (1859–1921), U.S. Representative from Virginia

Other uses
 Rorer, a pharmaceutical company founded in 1910 and acquired by Rhône-Poulenc in 1990
 Rorer, West Virginia, United States, an unincorporated community

German-language surnames